Jamie or James O'Reilly may refer to:

Clergymen
James O'Reilly (priest) (1836–1887), American Roman Catholic priest
James O'Reilly (bishop) (1855–1934), American Roman Catholic bishop of Fargo, 1909–1934

Public officials
James O'Reilly (Canadian politician) (1823–1875), Ontario lawyer and MP
James Edwin O'Reilly (1833–1907), Canadian mayor of Hamilton, Ontario
James O'Reilly (Irish politician) (1916–1992), Northern Irish nationalist
James O'Reilly (judge) (born 1955), Canadian lawyer and Federal judge

Sportsmen
Jamie O'Reilly (born 1988), Irish Gaelic footballer
James O'Reilly (rugby union) (born 1994), New Zealand hooker

See also
James Reilly (disambiguation)
James Riley (disambiguation)